The Wapei languages constitute a branch of the Torricelli language family according to Laycock (1975) (quoted from Foley 2018). Glottolog does not accept this grouping. They are spoken in mountainous regions of eastern Sandaun Province, Papua New Guinea.

Languages
Languages are:
Alu–Galu: Alu, Sinagen
A.O.E: Olo, Elkei, Au
Yau–Yis: Yis, Yau
Ningil–Yil: Yil, Ningil
West Palai [perhaps Palei languages]: Yeri (Yapunda), Walman

Gnau may also belong here.

Pronouns
Pronouns in Wapei languages are:

{| 
|+ Wapei pronouns
!  !! Elkei !! Yau !! Yis !! Au !! Yil !! Ningil
|-
! 1s
| ki || ki || ki || xi || i || yi
|-
! 2s
| ite || yi || yi || ti || a || pay
|-
! 3s
| elel || rən || rən || xərak || an || pan
|-
! 1p
| ku || kufu || kufu || xaiw || aw || you
|-
! 2p
| yife || yifi || yifi || yi || ɨ || piyou
|-
! 3p
| elpel || rəl || rəl || xər || aral || pəram
|}

Vocabulary comparison
The following basic vocabulary words are from Laycock (1968), as cited in the Trans-New Guinea database:

{| class="wikitable sortable"
! gloss !! Au !! Dia !! Elkei !! Ningil !! Olo !! Sinagen !! Yil !! Yis !! Yau
|-
! head
| faʔan || pale || palau || waʔal || uːru || peine || ariyi || lülü || nülü
|-
! ear
| nikif || ma || ŋipi || məkər || məŋkam || ma || mək || yapot || yampər
|-
! eye
| naʔan || yampax ||  || namək || lüs || napaka || nap || kwutiyane || kwuriyaf
|-
! nose
| yipwur || maləx ||  || nəfənək || minopoŋko || malka || nupuŋk || minityu || minit
|-
! tooth
| yaxas || yaŋkən || nulpo || naː || nelpə || naːkən || nak || yanət || yaːnət
|-
! tongue
| niːn || yilwat || yuwaŋ || waːr || non ||  || war ||  || yimyau
|-
! leg
| xət || xuwə || tiye || yau || orou || walək || suː || kiriu || kiriu
|-
! louse
| nəmk || raləx || nəmeiləm || nəmaŋkar || nəmom || rarka || namkar || kwutəl || kwurəl
|-
! dog
| napara || patə || palel || faréː || pele || pata || par || asi || piːren
|-
! bird
| xoura || antə || aulon || aprei || nafle || nata || afər || yafren || yafren
|-
! egg
| yinu || yilkit || yülam || yuːlək || yiləm || puta || wiːlər || yilip || walilip
|-
! blood
| amkra || amkə || omkol || niːkri || təlüs || leŋka || nək || nawan || nawe
|-
! bone
| xəmik || lakət || emiŋel || ləmeʔi || emio || lakita || nimik || kəmiene || kumialen
|-
! skin
| yilik || pawült || paulou || faːwal || topo || pawulta || pawar || tərkwaf || ternan
|-
! breast
| nəm || mate || niman || maːʔ || nemer || mata || mak || nəmar || numar
|-
! tree
| nuː || lowə || nipel || luː || nəmpe || niːpa || loː || nifif || nimpip
|-
! man
| mitik || teralkit || monol || masin || metene || matei || məsin || metfaine || ruːtil
|-
! woman
| mite || yuː || matal || naʔ aipi || moːto || nusakei || matei || kulum || wapur
|-
! sun
| wupli || wopli || wopli || wufliyəx || epli || xahi || wupli || kwapli || kwipli
|-
! moon
| wunkə || ouyi || auniyil || onyil || ane || aunəxə || uni || noulai || nuːlai
|-
! water
| təpar || niː || tipel || niː || tepe || wɨn || niː || tipal || təpal
|-
! fire
| siː || yalix || wul || walk || weli || yakə || walk || wəti || weli
|-
! stone
|  || xəte || talmanəf || xəroi || erau || kita || yir || kranə || krapene
|-
! two
| wikat || wiye || wiŋe || wilal || wiŋkes || fiyə || wiyem || wiyum || wiyəm
|}

References

 

 
Torricelli Range languages
Languages of Sandaun Province